Thus is Life (Spanish: Así es la vida) is a 1930 American Spanish language romantic comedy film directed by George Crone and starring José Bohr, Delia Magana and Lolita Vendrell. It was produced as the Spanish version of the English language film What a Man!, also directed by Crone. In the early years of sound such multi-language versions were common, and only declined with the development of dubbing.

Plot
A British ex-Grenadier Guards officer moves to America, but struggles to find work. After he is employed as a chauffeur to a wealthy family, he falls in love with his employer's daughter.

Cast
José Bohr as José Rolan  
Delia Magaña as Luisa Franklyn  
Lolita Vendrell as Blanca Franklyn  
César Vanoni as Manuel  
Enrique Acosta as Señor Franklyn  
Marcela Nivón as Señora Franklyn  
Tito Davison as Jorge Franklyn  
Myrta Bonillas as La contessa 
Julian Rivero as Calton  
Ernesto Piedra as Sapo  
Rosita Gil as Cora

References

External links

Spanish-language American films
American romantic comedy films
1930 romantic comedy films
Films directed by George Crone
American multilingual films
Films based on American novels
American films based on plays
American black-and-white films
Films with screenplays by Tom Gibson
1930 multilingual films
1930s Spanish-language films
1930s American films